Adam Ambra (born 27 August 1993) is a Slovak footballer.

Club career
Ambra started his career as a centre back for youth team of ŠK Malacky, later was transferred to Slovan Bratislava. In 2011 was joined to Italian side U.C. AlbinoLeffe.

AlbinoLeffe
Ambra began his career in Italy with U.C. AlbinoLeffe. He made his professional debut for AlbinoLeffe against Portogruaro.

References

External links

1993 births
Living people
Sportspeople from Skalica
Expatriate footballers in Italy
Association football defenders
Slovak expatriate footballers
Slovak footballers
Slovakia youth international footballers
U.C. AlbinoLeffe players